Solar radio may refer to:

 Solar-powered radio, a portable radio receiver powered by solar energy
 Solar radio emission, radio waves that are naturally produced by the Sun
 Solar Radio, a soul radio station based in London, England